DS1 or DS-1 may refer to:
 BOSS DS-1, a guitar distortion pedal
 Digital Signal 1, a T-carrier signaling scheme devised by Bell Labs
 Deep Space 1, a mission to 9969 Braille & 19P/Borrelly
 DS-1 (drug), a selective GABAA α4β3δ agonist drug
 South African Class DS1, a diesel locomotive class
 Datsun DS-1, a car by Nissan, see Datsun DS Series
 Dark Souls, an action role-playing game
 Dead Space (2008 video game), a survival horror game
 VR Class Ds1, a Finnish railbus class

See also
 DS (disambiguation)
 Canon EOS-1Ds series